Scorpidotrema is a genus of trematodes in the family Opecoelidae. It consists of only one species, Scorpidotrema longistipes Aken'Ova & Cribb, 2003.

References

Opecoelidae
Plagiorchiida genera
Monotypic protostome genera